Grant Connell and Glenn Michibata were the defending champions, but did not participate this year.

Tim Pawsat and Tim Wilkison won the title, defeating Kelly Evernden and Sammy Giammalva Jr. 7–5, 6–3 in the final.

Seeds

  Tim Pawsat /  Tim Wilkison (champions)
  Kelly Evernden /  Sammy Giammalva Jr. (final)
  Alex Antonitsch /  Jonathan Canter (semifinals)
  Mark Ozer /  Gianluca Pozzi (quarterfinals)

Draw

Draw

External links
 Draw

Doubles